The Angel Film Festival is an annual independent film festival that takes places in Islington, London. The festival seeks to support London- and UK-based makers of independent film, as well as to provide a relaxed environment for London film goers to enjoy movies that would not traditionally be screened in London.

The festival was launched in 2006.

References

External links
Official Website

Film festivals in London
Media and communications in the London Borough of Islington
Film festivals established in 2006